Richmond Hill is a hillside suburb above Sumner in Christchurch, New Zealand.

Richmond Hill is a volcanic spur extending from Tauhinukorokio / Mount Pleasant. The first European owner was Edward Dobson, who had a cottage in Nayland Street and whose  ran up the hill. Dobson kept  around his house and sold the remainder of his land to George Day. Upon Day's death, the land passed to his daughter, who sold it to the Morton brothers (Arthur and R. M. D.), and who in turn sold it to George Humphreys. The latter subdivided the land and had a road up the hill built by 1909. Walter de Thier managed Humphreys' farm on the hill and his favourite song was "The Lass of Richmond Hill", and with Humphreys' consent, the property was called Richmond Hill.

Humphreys was a leading businessman who lived at Daresbury in Fendalton. He was also a member of the Christchurch Golf Club and took pity of a group of men who regularly met in Sumner on an empty section for an improvised game of golf using hockey sticks, tennis balls, and tin cans sank into the ground as holes. He offered them  of his undulating land, on which the 12-hole Richmond Hill Golf Course opened in April 1910.

Due to the steepness of the road up from Nayland Street, the subdivision was slow to develop. There were just ten houses on Richmond Hill by 1930, and activity only picked up after the end of World War II. One of the early residents included the architect Cecil Wood. The golf course closed in December 1997 and some of the land was further subdivided.

Demographics
Richmond Hill is part of the Clifton Hill SA2 statistical area.

It had a population of 390 at the 2018 New Zealand census, an increase of 123 people (46.1%) since the 2013 census, and an increase of 57 people (17.1%) since the 2006 census. There were 135 households. There were 195 males and 198 females, giving a sex ratio of 0.98 males per female. The median age was 44.5 years (compared with 37.4 years nationally), with 81 people (20.8%) aged under 15 years, 51 (13.1%) aged 15 to 29, 216 (55.4%) aged 30 to 64, and 45 (11.5%) aged 65 or older.

Ethnicities were 95.4% European/Pākehā, 1.5% Māori, 0.0% Pacific peoples, 3.8% Asian, and 1.5% other ethnicities (totals add to more than 100% since people could identify with multiple ethnicities).

Although some people objected to giving their religion, 57.7% had no religion, 33.1% were Christian, 0.8% were Buddhist and 0.8% had other religions.

Of those at least 15 years old, 132 (42.7%) people had a bachelor or higher degree, and 24 (7.8%) people had no formal qualifications. The median income was $53,900, compared with $31,800 nationally. The employment status of those at least 15 was that 183 (59.2%) people were employed full-time, 57 (18.4%) were part-time, and 9 (2.9%) were unemployed.

Notes

References

Suburbs of Christchurch